Scalasca is a free and open-source software for measurement, analysis, and optimization of parallel program performance. It is licensed under the BSD-style license.

Scalasca is mostly used for profiling scientific and engineering applications using OpenMP and/or MPI. It supports runtime analysis on supercomputers. The application being analysed needs first of all to be "instrumented": MPI usage is instrumented simply by linking the application to the measuring library, while OpenMP usage is instrumented by recompiling from source using Scalasca's modified compiler.

References

External links 
 Official website

Free software
Software using the BSD license